Aberdeen Township is a township in Brown County, South Dakota, United States. As of the 2010 census, its population was 934.5.

References

Townships in Brown County, South Dakota
Aberdeen, South Dakota micropolitan area
Townships in South Dakota